N-Methylmorpholine is the organic compound with the formula O(CH2CH2)2NCH3.  It is a colorless liquid.  It is a cyclic tertiary amine.  It is used as a base catalyst for generation of polyurethanes and other reactions. It is produced by the reaction of methylamine and diethylene glycol as well as by the hydrogenolysis of N-formylmorpholine. It is the precursor to N-methylmorpholine N-oxide, a commercially important oxidant.

References 

4-Morpholinyl compunds
Reagents for organic chemistry